Hilary Miller may refer to:

 Hal Miller (1929–2015), British politician
 Hilary Miller (artist) (1919–1993), British artist and illustrator

See also
Hal Miller (disambiguation)